Ichida (written: 市田 lit. "market field") is a Japanese surname. Notable people with the surname include:

Soichi Ichida (1910–1986), Japanese philatelist
 (1843–1896), Japanese photographer
 (born 1942), Japanese politician

See also
, train station in Takamori, Shimoina District, Nagano Prefecture, Japan

Japanese-language surnames